Josaia Wini Raisuqe (born 22 July 1994) is a Fijian rugby union footballer. He played wing for French Top 14 champions, Stade Français. His current club is French Rugby Pro D2 side, Nevers.

Career

Early career
Wini was born in Lutu, Naitasiri and he took up rugby at a very young age. He dreamed of playing for the Fiji 7's team and it came to fruition when the then Fiji 7's coach Ben Ryan spotted him playing in the Martintar and Marist 7's and selected him for the Fiji 7's team for the 2015 Hong Kong Sevens. He played in 5 tournaments for Fiji scoring 14 tries but in July 2015, French Top 14 side, Stade Français signed him up for the 2015–16 Top 14 season.

Stade Français

He made his debut on October 31 against Agen off the bench. He also made the side for the 2015–16 European Rugby Champions Cup pool stage. He scored two tries against Benetton Treviso. but in a game against Munster two weeks later, he was red carded for eye-gouging Munster captain CJ Stander and even though Stade won the game, Raisuqe was charged for Eye-gouging and suspended for 15 weeks. He returned to rugby the following season and then went on to make the Stade side for the 2016–17 European Rugby Challenge Cup pool stage as Stade were demoted after failing to make the cut for the 2016–17 European Rugby Champions Cup after being unable to finish in the Top 8 in the 2015–16 Top 14 season. He helped Stade make the Cup Quarter final but in their Quarter final match against Ospreys, he received a yellow carded for foul play which was followed by another yellow card (and a red) after entering a ruck from the side but videos for the game showed he stamped on Osprey winger, Keelan Giles for which he was cited and later given a 10-week suspension.

Controversy
On July 22, 2017, he decided to celebrate his birthday drinking at a club along with teammate, Waisea Nayacalevu. They both left the club intoxicated and on the way they met a woman, Raisuqe grabbed the woman and physically molested her by fondling her breasts. Her friends tried to help but both Raisuqe and Nayacalevu punched them. Raisuqe and Nayacalevu were picked up by police at around 3am and spent the whole day in jail. They were taken to court two days later and a trial date was set for 29 November.

On 18 August, Stade Francais fired Raisuqe for "gross misconduct" and gave Nayacalevu a formal warning.

Return to rugby
In September 2017, he was picked up by Pro D2 side, Nevers for the 2017–18 Rugby Pro D2 season. He enjoyed an excellent 2018–19 season, helping his club to a top six finish, and was the league's top try scorer with 15 tries.

In January 2021, after winning a tough game against Béziers (30-25), he lifted the referee in the extra time and got sent off. He was subsequently banned for 5 weeks for that incident. As of today, Raisuqe has 10 yellow cards and 5 red cards to his name in french rugby as well as a yellow card he collected when playing with the Fiji 7's team.

Honours

Personal
Rugby Pro D2 top try scorer: 2018–19 (15 tries)

References

External links
 Josaia Raisuqe at ItsRugby.fr 
 

1994 births
Living people
Fijian rugby union players
Fijian expatriate rugby union players
Expatriate rugby union players in France
Rugby union wings
Fijian expatriate sportspeople in France
Stade Français players
I-Taukei Fijian people